Simona Halep won the first edition of the tournament, defeating Roberta Vinci in the final, 6–1, 6–3.

Seeds

Draw

Finals

Top half

Bottom half

Qualifying

Seeds

Qualifiers

Lucky losers
  Indy de Vroome

Draw

First qualifier

Second qualifier

Third qualifier

Fourth qualifier

References

Main Draw
Qualifying Draw

BRD Bucharest Open - Singles
2014 Singles